Artur Karvatski (born 21 January 1996) is a Latvian-born Belarusian handball player who plays for Dinamo Viktor Stavropol and the Belarusian national team.

He participated at the 2018 European Men's Handball Championship.

References

1996 births
Living people
People from Preiļi
Belarusian male handball players
Expatriate handball players
Olympiacos H.C. players
Belarusian expatriate sportspeople in Hungary
Belarusian people of Latvian descent